Pengeri also named as Pengeeree is a region in Tinsukia district, Assam, India. Pengeri covers approximately 30 square kilometers and carries a vast history of militancy.

Till 1992, Pengeri was the India's largest producer of citronella.

References 

Neighbourhoods in Assam
Tinsukia district